Philipson or Phillipson is a surname.

Philipson has also been the original uncut version of Phillips; a German surname especially prevalent amongst German Jews and Dutch Jews.

It may refer to:

A. T. Phillipson (1910-1971), Scottish vet
Craig Philipson (b. 1982), Australian cricketer
David Philipson (1862–1949), American Reform rabbi, orator, and author
Dino Philipson (1889–1972), Italian lawyer and politician 
Sir George Hare Philipson (1836–1918), English physician
Hilton Philipson (1892–1941), British politician; elected as MP from Berwick-upon-Tweed but election was overturned
Hylton Philipson (1866–1935), English cricketer and gardener
Hylton Murray-Philipson (1902–1934), British politician; MP from Peebles and Southern
Mabel Philipson (1887–1951), British actress and politician; MP from Berwick-upon-Tweed 1923–29
Morris Philipson (1926–2011), American novelist and book publisher
Sir Robin Philipson (1916–1992), British artist
Sten Philipson (born 1946), Swedish ethicist
Tomas J. Philipson (contemporary), American professor of health economics

See also
Phillipson
Philippson

Patronymic surnames
Surnames from given names